Răzvan Vasilescu (born 14 August 1954) is a Romanian actor. He has appeared in 40 films and television shows since 1979. He starred in The Oak, which was screened out of competition at the 1992 Cannes Film Festival.

Selected filmography

 The Oak (1992)
Betrayal (1993)
 An Unforgettable Summer (1994)
 State of Things (1995)
 Too Late (1996)
 Nekro (1997)
Train of Life (1998)
 Stuff and Dough (2001)
 Niki and Flo (2003)
 Offset (2004)
 California Dreamin' (2007)
 Fire and Ice: The Dragon Chronicles (2009)
 Ashes and Blood (2009)
 Bibliothèque Pascal (2010)
 Gainsbourg: A Heroic Life (2010)
 Portrait of the Fighter as a Young Man (2010)
 Somewhere in Palilula (2012)
 Mirage (2014)

References

External links

1954 births
Living people
Romanian male film actors